Events in the year 1856 in Norway.

Incumbents
Monarch: Oscar I

Events

Arts and literature

Notable births

11 January – Christian Sinding, composer (died 1941)
17 January – Jens Bratlie, politician and Prime Minister of Norway (died 1939)
11 February – Torje Olsen Solberg, politician
13 March – Hans G. Jensen, tailor, trade unionist and politician (died 1922)
23 March – Johan Nordhagen, artist (died 1956)
24 June – Haldor Johan Hanson,  Norwegian-American hymn writer, publisher and author. (died 1929)
21 July – Anne Bolette Holsen, teacher and proponent for women's rights (died 1913). 
6 August – Anton Johan Rønneberg, politician (died 1922)
11 September – Otto Jensen, bishop, politician and Minister (died 1918)
9 December – Gerhard Gran, literary historian, professor, magazine editor, essayist and biographer (died 1925)

Full date unknown
Kristofer Kristofersson Hjeltnes, horticulturist and politician (died 1930)
Jacob Marius Schøning, politician and Minister (died 1934)

Notable deaths
26 February - Teis Lundegaard, farmer, shipowner, politician and representative at the Norwegian Constituent Assembly (born 1774)
1 July – Peder Jensen Fauchald, politician (born 1791)
15 September – Severin Løvenskiold, nobleman and politician (born 1777)

Full date unknown
Andreas Aagaard Kiønig, judge and politician (born 1771)
Nicolai Johan Lohmann Krog, politician and Minister (born 1787)
Niels Andreas Thrap, politician (born 1793)

See also

References